Peter George Whiteman  (born 8 August 1942) is a retired British barrister, judge, professor and author.

Career
Whiteman has been a deputy high court judge since 1994, and professor of law at the University of Virginia since 1980, and a visiting professor at the University of California Berkeley since 1980.

Personal life
Whiteman was married to Katharine Ruth Ellenbogen in 1971 and they had two daughters.  Katharine was killed in a road accident in Argentina in 2009.  Whiteman retired in December 2014 and in 2017 he married Sally Patricia Mary Carter on a beach in Antigua.

Selected publications
Whiteman on Income Tax (1988)
Whiteman on Capital Gains Tax (1988)
British Tax Encyclopedia (1988)
No Bar To Success (2016)

References

1942 births
Living people
British barristers
University of Virginia faculty
Ellenbogen family
British King's Counsel
20th-century King's Counsel
21st-century King's Counsel